Candelariodon is an extinct genus of carnivorous probainognathian cynodonts from the Middle to Late Triassic Santa Maria Formation of the Paraná Basin in Rio Grande do Sul state, Brazil. Candelariodon is known from a partial mandible having some complete teeth. It was first named by Téo Veiga de Oliveira, Cesar Leandro Schultz, Marina Bento Soares and Carlos Nunes Rodrigues in 2011 and the type species is Candelariodon barberenai.

Description 

The holotype (MMACR PV-0001-T) of Candelariodon barberenai comes from the Dinodontosaurus Assemblage Zone of the Pinheros-Chiniquá Sequence, Santa Maria Supersequence. It corresponds to the lower portion of the traditional Santa Maria Formation and the Santa Maria 1 Sequence of Zerfass et al. (2003).

Classification 
Martinelli et al. (2017) performed a phylogenetic analysis where Candelariodon was recovered as the sister taxon of a clade formed by Protheriodon and Prozostrodontia; a cladogram from that study is shown below:

References 

Prehistoric probainognathians
Prehistoric cynodont genera
Ladinian genera
Carnian genera
Middle Triassic synapsids of South America
Late Triassic synapsids of South America
Triassic Brazil
Fossils of Brazil
Santa Maria Formation
Fossil taxa described in 2011